The 2016 Speedway European Championship season was the fourth season of the Speedway European Championship (SEC) era, and the 16th UEM Individual Speedway European Championship. It was the fourth series under the promotion of One Sport Lts. of Poland.

The championship was won by Nicki Pedersen, who claimed the title for the first time. He won by two points from Václav Milík, who beat Krzysztof Kasprzak in a run-off for second place. Grigory Laguta and Leon Madsen finished fourth and fifth to ensure qualification for the 2017 competition. Two-time defending champion Emil Sayfutdinov finished seventh.

Qualification 
For the 2016 season, 15 permanent riders were joined at each SEC Final by one wild card and two track reserves.

Defending champion, Emil Sayfutdinov from Russia was automatically invited to participate in all final events. Nicki Pedersen, Antonio Lindbäck, Janusz Kołodziej and Martin Vaculík secured their participation in all final events thanks to being in the top five of the general classification in the 2015 season.

Seven riders qualified through the SEC Challenge and the line-up was then completed when Grigory Laguta, Václav Milík and Andžejs Ļebedevs received and accepted wild cards to compete.

Qualified riders

Calendar

Qualification 
The calendar for qualification consisted of 3 Semifinal events and one SEC Challenge event.

Championship Series 
A four-event calendar was scheduled for the final series, with events in Germany, Latvia, Russia and Poland.

Classification

See also 
 2016 Speedway Grand Prix

References

External links 

 

2016
European Championship
Speedway European Championship